Cyrus Ingerson Scofield (August 19, 1843 – July 24, 1921) was an American theologian, minister, and writer whose best-selling annotated Bible popularized futurism and dispensationalism among fundamentalist Christians.

Biography

Childhood
Cyrus Scofield was born in Clinton Township, Lenawee County, Michigan, the seventh and last child of Elias and Abigail Goodrich Scofield.  Elias Scofield's ancestors were of English and Puritan descent, but the family was nominally Episcopalian. Abigail Scofield died three months after Cyrus's birth, and his father twice remarried during Cyrus's minority. Details of his early education are unknown, but there is no reason to doubt his later testimony that he was an enthusiastic reader and that he had studied Shakespeare and Homer.

Civil War service
By 1861, Scofield was living with relatives in Lebanon, Tennessee.  At the beginning of the American Civil War, the 17-year-old Scofield enlisted as a private in the 7th Tennessee Infantry, C.S.A., and his regiment fought at Cheat Mountain, Seven Pines, and Antietam.  In 1862, after spending a month in Chimborazo Hospital in Richmond, Virginia, Scofield successfully petitioned for a discharge. Scofield then returned to Lebanon and was conscripted again into Confederate service.  Ordered to McMinnville, Tennessee, Scofield deserted and escaped behind Union lines in Bowling Green, Kentucky. After taking the Union oath of allegiance, Scofield was allowed safe passage to St. Louis, Missouri, where he settled.

Lawyer and politician
In 1866, he married Leontine LeBeau Cerrè, a member of a prominent French Catholic family in St. Louis. Scofield apprenticed in the law office of his brother-in-law and then worked in the St. Louis assessor's office before moving to Atchison, Kansas, in late 1869. In 1871, Scofield was elected to the Kansas House of Representatives, first from Atchison for one year and then from Nemaha County, for a second. In 1873 he worked for the election of John J. Ingalls as senator from Kansas, and when Ingalls won, the new senator had Scofield appointed U. S. District Attorney for Kansas—at 29, the youngest in the country. Nevertheless, that same year Scofield was forced to resign "under a cloud of scandal" because of questionable financial transactions, which may have included accepting bribes from railroads, stealing political contributions intended for Ingalls, and securing bank promissory notes by forging signatures. It is possible Scofield was jailed on forgery charges, although there is no extant evidence in the public records.

Perhaps in part because of his self-confessed heavy drinking, Scofield abandoned his wife and two daughters during this period. Leontine Cerrè Scofield divorced him on grounds of desertion in 1883, and the same year Scofield married Hettie Hall von Wartz, with whom he eventually had a son.

Conversion and ministerial career

Pastorates
According to Scofield, he was converted to evangelical Christianity through the testimony of a lawyer acquaintance. Certainly by the late fall of 1879, Scofield was assisting in the St. Louis evangelistic campaign conducted by Dwight L. Moody, and he served as the secretary of the St. Louis YMCA. Significantly, Scofield came under the mentorship of James H. Brookes, pastor of Walnut Street Presbyterian Church, St. Louis, a prominent dispensationalist premillennialist.

In October 1883, Scofield was ordained as a Congregationalist minister—while his divorce was proceeding but not yet final—and he accepted the pastorate of a small mission church founded by that denomination, which became the First Congregational Church of Dallas, Texas (now Scofield Memorial Church). The church grew from fourteen to over five hundred members before he resigned its pastorate in 1895. In 1895, Scofield was called as pastor of Moody's church, the Trinitarian Congregational Church of East Northfield, Massachusetts. Scofield also attempted with limited success to take charge of Moody's Northfield Bible Training School.

Interest in missions
In 1888, Scofield attended the Niagara Bible Conference where he met pioneer missionary to China, Hudson Taylor. Taylor's approach to Christian missions influenced Scofield to found the Central American Mission in 1890 (now Camino Global). Scofield also served as superintendent of the American Home Missionary Society of Texas and Louisiana; and in 1890, he helped found, and was chairman of the board, of Lake Charles College (1890–1903), Lake Charles, Louisiana.

Fundamentalist leader
As the author of the pamphlet "Rightly Dividing the Word of Truth" (1888), Scofield soon became a leader in dispensational premillennialism, a forerunner of twentieth-century Christian fundamentalism. Although, in theory, Scofield returned to his Dallas pastorate in 1903, his projected reference Bible consumed much of his energy, and he was also mostly either unwell or in Europe. When the Scofield Reference Bible was published in 1909, it quickly became the most influential statement of dispensational premillennialism, and Scofield's popularity as Bible conference speaker increased as his health continued to decline. Royalties from the work were substantial, and Scofield bought real estate in Dallas, Ashuelot, New Hampshire, and Douglaston, Long Island. He also joined the prestigious Lotos Club.

Scofield left the liberalizing Congregational Church to become a Southern Presbyterian and moved to the New York City area where he supervised a correspondence and lay institute, the New York Night School of the Bible. In 1914, he founded the Philadelphia School of the Bible in Philadelphia, Pennsylvania (now Cairn University).

Personal life
During the early 1890s, Scofield began styling himself Rev. C. I. Scofield, D.D.; but there are no extant records of any academic institution having granted him the honorary Doctor of Divinity degree. Scofield's second wife proved a faithful companion and editing assistant, but his relationships with his children, including librarian Abigail Scofield Kellogg, were distant at best. Scofield died at his home on Long Island in 1921.

Religious significance
Scofield's correspondence Bible study course was the basis for his Reference Bible, an annotated, and widely circulated, study Bible first published in 1909 by Oxford University Press. Scofield's notes teach futurism and dispensationalism, a theology advanced in the early nineteenth century by the Anglo-Irish clergyman John Nelson Darby, who like Scofield had been trained as a lawyer. Dispensationalism emphasizes the distinctions between the New Testament Church and ancient Israel of the Old Testament.  Scofield believed that between creation and the final judgment there are seven distinct eras of God's dealing with humanity and that these eras are a framework around which the message of the Bible can be explained. It was largely through the influence of Scofield's notes that dispensational premillennialism became influential among fundamentalist Christians in the United States, and these notes became a significant source for popular religious writers such as Hal Lindsey.

Notes

References
 Joseph M. Canfield, The Incredible Scofield and His Book, (Vallecito, California: Ross House Books, 1988).
 William E. Cox Why I Left Scofieldism (Phillipsburg, N.J.: Presbyterian and Reformed Publishing, 1992) .
 John Gerstner, Wrongly Dividing the Word of Truth, (Brentwood, Tennessee: Wolgemuth & Hyatt, 1991).
 John D. Hannah, "Scofield, Cyrus Ingerson," American National Biography.
 David Lutzweiler, The Praise of Folly: The Enigmatic Life and Theology of C. I. Scofield (Draper, VA: Apologetics Group Media, 2009).
 R. Todd Mangum and Mark S. Sweetnam, The Scofield Bible: Its History and Impact on the Evangelical Church (Colorado Springs: Paternoster, 2009).
 D. Jean Rushing, "From Confederate Deserter to Decorated Veteran Bible Scholar: Exploring the Enigmatic Life of C. I. Scofield, 1861–1921," MA Thesis, East Tennessee State University, 2011.
 Ernest R. Sandeen, The Roots of Fundamentalism, British and American Millenarianism, 1800–1930 (Chicago: University of Chicago Press, 1970).
 Charles G. Trumbull, The Life Story of C. I. Scofield (New York: Oxford University Press, 1920).

External links
 The Scofield Reference Bible complete text, notes and cross references 1917
 C. I. Scofield books
 The Scofield Reference Bible Notes 1917
 Cyrus Scofield letters, hosted by the Portal to Texas History
  Rightly Dividing The Word of Truth
 Ernest Reisinger, "A History of Dispensationalism in America." Criticism of dispensationalism by a Southern Baptist with a Reformed perspective.

1843 births
1921 deaths
19th-century American male writers
19th-century American non-fiction writers
19th-century Congregationalist ministers
19th-century Presbyterian ministers
20th-century American male writers
20th-century American non-fiction writers
20th-century Presbyterian ministers
American Calvinist and Reformed ministers
American Christian theologians
American evangelicals
American male non-fiction writers
American Presbyterians
American religious writers
Cairn University
Christian fundamentalists
Confederate States Army soldiers
Converts to Presbyterianism
Deserters
Former Congregationalists
Northern-born Confederates
Republican Party members of the Kansas House of Representatives
People from Atchison, Kansas
People from Lenawee County, Michigan
Premillennialism
Presbyterian writers
Writers from Michigan